Sylvia A. Bacon (born July 9, 1931) is a former judge of the Superior Court of the District of Columbia who was considered by both Richard Nixon and Ronald Reagan as a potential nominee to the Supreme Court of the United States, at a time when no women had yet been appointed to the Court.

Early life and education
Born in Watertown, South Dakota, Bacon graduated Watertown High School in 1949 and received a B.A. in Economics from Vassar College after three years (1952), a Graduate Certificate in Economics from the London School of Economics through a Rotary Fellowship (1953), an LL.B. from Harvard Law School (1956), and an LL.M. from the Georgetown University Law Center (1959). While at Vassar, she was an officer in the National Student Association. From 1956 to 1957, she was a judicial law clerk to District Court judge Burnita Shelton Matthews.

Career
She worked in various positions within the United States Department of Justice from 1956 to 1970, during which time she "helped draft the District of Columbia's controversial no-knock crime bill", and "served under Ramsey Clark and helped draft legislation for court reform in the District of Columbia." She was appointed to the Superior Court of the District of Columbia in 1970, serving until 1991. She was considered to be a nominee for the Supreme Court of the United States by both Presidents Reagan and Nixon.

As of June 2010, Bacon was a "distinguished lecturer" on the faculty of the Catholic University of America, Columbus School of Law.

In 1986, after "complaints" by "prosecutors and defense lawyers" about her appearing to be "confused and disoriented", Bacon was treated for alcohol abuse, as documented by Elsa Walsh in The Washington Post. In 1987, the highest appellate court in the District of Columbia reversed Bacon's ruling against Georgetown University LGBTQ undergraduate and law students in Gay Rights Coalition v. Georgetown University, in which Bacon had found that Georgetown's religious origin protected it from complying with the District of Columbia Human Rights Act, which bans discrimination on the basis of sexual orientation.

See also

Richard Nixon Supreme Court candidates
Ronald Reagan Supreme Court candidates

References

1931 births
Alumni of the London School of Economics
American women judges
Columbus School of Law faculty
Judges of the Superior Court of the District of Columbia
Georgetown University Law Center alumni
Harvard Law School alumni
Living people
No-knock warrant
People from Watertown, South Dakota
Vassar College alumni
American women academics
21st-century American women